Gazchat (also Romanized as Gazchāt) is a village in Negur Rural District, Dashtiari District, Chabahar County, Sistan and Baluchestan Province, Iran. At the 2006 census, its population was 54, in 9 families.

References 

Populated places in Chabahar County